This is the results breakdown of the local elections held in the Valencian Community on 3 April 1979. The following tables show detailed results in the autonomous community's most populous municipalities, sorted alphabetically.

Overall

City control
The following table lists party control in the most populous municipalities, including provincial capitals (shown in bold).

Municipalities

Alcoy
Population: 64,545

Alicante
Population: 232,019

Benidorm
Population: 25,260

Castellón de la Plana
Population: 115,522

Elche
Population: 160,071

Elda
Population: 52,214

Gandia
Population: 46,248

Orihuela
Population: 50,245

Paterna
Population: 32,331

Sagunto
Population: 56,351

Torrent
Population: 49,833

Torrevieja
Population: 12,735

Valencia

Population: 737,129

References

Valencian Community
1979